Yakunino is a rural locality (a village) in Yalangachevsky Selsoviet, Baltachevsky District, Bashkortostan, Russia. The population was 70 as of 2010. There are 2 streets.

Geography 
Yakunino is located 38 km southeast of Starobaltachevo (the district's administrative centre) by road. Yalangachevo is the nearest rural locality.

References 

Rural localities in Baltachevsky District